Gandharva Giri is a 1983 Indian Kannada-language film, directed by N. S. Dhananjaya (Datthu) and produced by N. S. Mukund, H. S. Chandru, Smt B. A. Anasuya and Smt Veena Nagaraj. It is based on the novel of the same name by Saisuthe. The film stars Vishnuvardhan, Aarathi, J. V. Somayajulu and Anupama. The film has musical score by Upendra Kumar.

Cast

Vishnuvardhan
Aarathi 
J. V. Somayajulu as Narasimha Josheyar
Manu
 Anupama 
Sundar Krishna Urs 
Rajanand
Leelavathi
Sathyapriya in Guest Appearance

Soundtrack
The music was composed by Upendra Kumar.

References

External links
 
 

1983 films
1980s Kannada-language films
Films scored by Upendra Kumar